Jung Hye-young (born December 14, 1973) is a South Korean actress. She is a part of the YG Entertainment group and is best known for her roles in Korean television dramas.

Personal life 
In 2004, Jung married Sean Noh, a member of hip-hop duo Jinusean. They have four children - two daughters and two sons.

Filmography

Television series

Variety Shows

Film

Music video
"그대 뿐이죠" (XO, 2004)

Book
Today, the More I Love You (essays, 2008)
Happier Today (essays, 2014)

Awards and nominations

References

External links 
 

1973 births
Living people
People from Seoul
Actresses from Seoul
South Korean film actresses
South Korean television actresses
YG Entertainment artists
Seoul Institute of the Arts alumni